The physiological density or real population density is the number of people per unit area of arable land.

A higher physiological density suggests that the available agricultural land is being used by more and may reach its output limit sooner than a country that has a lower physiological density.  Egypt is a notable example, with physiological density reaching that of Bangladesh, despite much desert.

See also
Population density
List of countries by physiological density

Food security
Human overpopulation
Population density
Population ecology
Environmental impact of agriculture
Environmental controversies